Stardust is a studio album by American singer Natalie Cole, released on September 24, 1996. Cole won the Grammy Award for Best Pop Collaboration with Vocals for the song "When I Fall in Love", a duet with Nat King Cole, at the 39th Grammy Awards.

The song also won the Grammy Award for Best Instrumental Arrangement with Accompanying Vocal(s) for arrangers Alan Broadbent and David Foster. The album was nominated for Best Traditional Pop Vocal Performance.

Track listing
Unless otherwise noted, Information is based on the album's Liner Notes

Notes
Nat King Cole's "Let's Face the Music and Dance" originally recorded on November 21, 1961
Nat King Cole's "When I Fall in Love" originally recorded on December 28, 1956
Portuguese lyrics on "Dindi" written by Louis Oliveira
Additional lyrics on "Two for the Blues" written by Natalie Cole
Additional Portuguese lyrics on by Dori Caymmi, Dorival Caymmi and Natalie Cole

Personnel 
Information is based on the album's Liner Notes
 Natalie Cole – lead vocals, vocal arrangements (5, 7, 14), backing vocals (7, 10), music arrangements (17)
 Terry Trotter – acoustic piano (1, 4, 5, 12, 13, 16-18), Fender Rhodes (1, 13), keyboards (12, 18)
 Michael Lang – acoustic piano (2)
 Rob Mounsey – acoustic piano (3, 6, 8, 9, 11, 15), additional keyboards (3), keyboards (6, 8, 9, 11, 15), music arrangements (6, 8, 9, 15)
 Nat King Cole – Hammond B3 organ solo (3), lead vocals (5)
 George Duke – acoustic piano (7), keyboards (7, 10), music arrangements (7, 10, 17), vibraphone (10), horn arrangements (10), vocals arrangements (14)
 Bob James – keyboards (14), acoustic piano solo (14), music arrangements (14)
 John Chiodini – guitar (1, 2, 4, 5, 12, 13, 16-18), acoustic guitar (7)
 John Pizzarelli – guitar (3, 6, 8, 9, 11)
 Paul Jackson Jr. – electric guitar (7, 10)
 Lee Ritenour – guitar solo (14) 
 Jim Hughart – bass (1, 4, 13, 16), music arrangements (16)
 Chuck Domanico – bass (2, 5)
 David Finck – bass (3, 6, 8, 9, 11, 15)
 Reggie Hamilton – bass (7, 10)
 Chuck Berghofer – bass (12, 18)
 Nathan East – bass (14, 17)
 Harold Jones – drums (1, 4, 13, 16)
 Ralph Penland – drums (2)
 Chris Parker – drums (3, 6, 8, 9, 11, 15)
 John Guerin – drums (5, 12, 18)
 John Robinson – drums (7, 10)
 Harvey Mason – drums (14)
 Bashiri Johnson – percussion (6, 9, 15)
 Paulinho da Costa – percussion (7, 17)
 Rafael Padilla – percussion (14)
 Dan Higgins – saxophone solo (5)
 Everette Harp – alto saxophone solo (10)
 Michael Brecker – saxophone solo (15)
 Jon Clarke – oboe solo (5)
 George Bohanon – trombone solo (4)
 Wynton Marsalis – trumpet solo (8)
 Toots Thielemans – harmonica solo (7, 9)
 Alan Broadbent – music arrangements (1-3, 5, 11, 13)
 John Clayton – music arrangements (4)
 David Foster – music arrangements (5), vocals arrangements (5)
 Gordon Jenkins – original music arrangements (5)
 Clare Fischer – strings arrangements (7, 17)
 Jerry Hey – horns arrangements (10, 14)
 Johnny Mandel – music arrangements (12, 18)
 Charles Floyd – music arrangements (16)
 Janis Siegel – backing and harmony vocals (10)

Production 
 Executive Producer – Natalie Cole
 Producers – Phil Ramone (Tracks 1, 3, 6, 8, 9, 11, 13 & 15); David Foster (Tracks 2, 5, 12 & 18); George Duke (Tracks 4, 7, 10, 14, 16 & 17); Natalie Cole (Track 17).
 Production Assistants – Simon Ramone (Tracks 1, 3, 6, 8, 9, 11, 13 & 15); Corrine Duke  (Tracks 4, 7, 10, 14 & 16, 17).
 Instrumental (Track) Recording – Al Schmitt (Tracks 1, 5, 12, 13 & 18); Elliot Scheiner (Tracks 3, 6, 8, 9, 11 & 15); Erik Zobler (Tracks 4, 7, 10, 14, 16 & 17); Dave Reitzas (Track 5).
 Vocal Recording – Al Schmitt (Tracks 1, 5, 13 & 18); Elliot Scheiner (Tracks 1, 3, 6, 8, 9, 11, 13 & 15); Dave Reitzas (Tracks 2, 4, 5, 12, 14, 17 & 18); Erik Zobler (Tracks 4, 7, 10, 14 & 16).
 Additional Engineering – Felipe Elgueta, Wayne Holmes, Henk Korff, John Patterson and Patrick Ulenberg.
 Assistant Engineers – Jeffrey Demorris, Peter Doell, Koji Ejawa, Rob Frank, Barry Goldberg, John Hendrickson, Glenn Marchese, Eddie Miller, Charlie Paakkari, Rail Rogut and Robbes Stieglitz.
 Mixed by Al Schmitt at Bill Schnee Studio (Hollywood, CA).
 Orchestra and Big Band Contractors – Debbie Datz, Jill Dell'Abate, Bill Hughes, Morris Repass and Patti Zimmitti.
 Project Coordinator – Shari Sutcliffe
 Album Concept – Natalie Cole
 Art Direction – Gabrielle Raumberger
 Design – Emily Rich
 Photography – Rocky Schenck
 Management – Dan Cleary
 Personal Assistant – Benita Hill Johnson
 Hair – Janet Zeitoun
 Make-up – Tara Posey
 Stylist – Cecille Parker
 Linguists – Dori Caymmi, Helena Caymmi, David Romano, Roberta Taurello and Veronique Triquet.
 Liner Notes – Dick La Palm

Charts

Certifications

References

1996 albums
Natalie Cole albums
Albums produced by Phil Ramone
Albums produced by George Duke
Albums produced by David Foster
Elektra Records albums
Covers albums
Traditional pop albums
Albums recorded at Capitol Studios